Presidential elections were held in Panama on 2 August 1920.

On 30 January 1920 President Belisario Porras Barahona resigned to stand for election in August. “Convinced that the ballot would be rigged, supporters of his opponent, Ciro Luis Urriola, repeatedly petitioned for U.S. supervision, only to be told the answer was no. Faced with this political death sentence, Ciro Urriola pulled out”.

Belisario Porras Barahona was elected “almost unanimously in one of the quietest elections in the history of the republic”.

Results

References

Panama
1920 in Panama
Presidential elections in Panama
Election and referendum articles with incomplete results